Lado Kralj (27 March 1938 – 12 December 2022) was a Slovene writer, theatre critic and literary historian. From 1987 to 2005 he worked as a professor in comparative literature at the University of Ljubljana. He published and contributed to numerous books on literature and theatre.

Kralj was born in Slovenj Gradec in northern Drava Banovina (today Slovenia) in 1938. He studied comparative and English literature at the University of Ljubljana where he also got his PhD in 1986. He attended postgraduate study at New York University (1970–1971) and co-founded an experimental theatre group upon his return to Ljubljana. Between 1978 and 1982 he was also artistic director at the Slovene National Theatre in Ljubljana. He worked as a lecturer at the University in Ljubljana until his retirement in 2005.

In 2010 he published his literary debut Kosec koso brusi (The Scyther Grinds the Scythe), which won him the Best Debut Novel Award awarded by the Union of Slovenian Publishers and Booksellers as well as the 2011 Fabula Award for best collection of short prose in Slovene published within the previous two years.

Kralj died on 12 December 2022, aged 84.

Published works
 Ekspresionizem (Expressionism), monograph, (1986)
 Teorija drame  (The Theory of Drama), (1998)
 Primerjalni članki (Comparative Articles), (2006)
 Kosec koso brusi (The Reaper Sharpening His Scythe), short stories, (2010)

References

External links
 Lado Kralj on Read Central, Slovenian literature in translation site

1938 births
2022 deaths
Slovenian literary critics
Slovenian literary historians
Fabula laureates
Slovenian male short story writers
Slovenian short story writers
University of Ljubljana alumni
New York University alumni
Academic staff of the University of Ljubljana
People from Slovenj Gradec